This article show all participating team squads at the 2002 Central American and Caribbean Games, played by eight countries and held from November 28 to December 8, 2002, in San Salvador, El Salvador.

Head Coach:

Head Coach: Braulio Godínez

Head Coach: Héctor Romero

Head Coach: Rolando Quintana

Head Coach: Sergio Hernández

Head Coach: Rene Quintana

Head Coach: David Alemán

Head Coach: Irina Bespalova

References 
 Norceca
 El Salvador Olympic Committee

C
Women's Squads, 2002 Central American And Caribbean Games
Central American and Caribbean Games